"Love Has No Name" is a song from British-New Zealand electronic dance music group Babble, which was released in 1996 as the sole single from their second and final studio album Ether. The song was written by Alannah Currie (lyrics) and Tom Bailey (music), and was produced by Bailey, Currie and Keith Fernley. It reached number 10 on the US Billboard Hot Dance Music Club Play chart.

The song features Teremoana Rapley as guest vocalist. It is the only track on Ether not to feature Bailey or Currie on lead vocals.

Critical reception
On its release, Larry Flick of Billboard described Babble as an act which "deftly blends electro-pop gloss with gritty dance and world beat rhythms" and praised Rapley as an "enigmatic vocal presence" which "bring[s] the melodramatic pose of a French chanteuse to the song". Flick also praised Todd Terry's house remix and drew comparisons to Terry's remix work on "Missing" by Everything but the Girl. In a review of Ether, Daina Darzin of Cash Box praised the song as "particularly memorable" and noted its "undulating dance beat" and "sensual, Sade-style vocals". Chuck Campbell of the Knoxville News–Sentinel noted it had a "livelier rhythm" than the rest of Ether, but added that the song was "in need of development".

Track listing

Personnel
Credits are adapted from the US double 12-inch vinyl single and the Ether CD booklet.

 Babble – music
 Teremoana Rapley – vocals

Production
 Tom Bailey – producer, programming, recording, mixing
 Alannah Currie – producer, recording, mixing
 Keith Fernley – producer, engineer, programming, recording, mixing

Remixes
 Tom Bailey – all remixes except "Remix Edit", "Tee's Freeze" and "Tee's Club"
 Simon Rycroft – assistant remixer on all remixes except "Remix Edit", "Tee's Freeze" and "Tee's Club"
 Todd Terry – remixer and additional production on "Remix Edit", "Tee's Freeze" and "Tee's Club"
 Matthias Heibron – engineer on "Remix Edit", "Tee's Freeze" and "Tee's Club"

Other
 V8 with Babble – sleeve design
 Melanie Bridge – photography

Charts

References

1996 songs
1996 singles
Reprise Records singles
Songs written by Alannah Currie
Songs written by Tom Bailey (musician)